Estefanía is a popular Venezuelan telenovela that was produced by and broadcast on Venezuela's Radio Caracas Televisión in 1979. The story idea was conceived by Julio César Marmol and Humberto (Kiko) Olivieri and the plot was based on the government of Marcos Pérez Jiménez. Pierina España and José Luis Rodríguez starred as the main protagonists with Gustavo Rodríguez as the main antagonist. It was distributed internationally by Coral International.

Synopsis
In 1957, Venezuela is under a harsh military regime. Estefanía Gallardo is a famous actress who is fighting to save her father who is in jail as a political prisoner in the hands of the ruthless National Security Command led by the bloodthirsty Pedro Escobar. Luis Alberto Seijas is engaged to Ana Maria Escobar, Pedro's daughter. One time, Estefanía helps Luis Alberto escape and there is an instant attraction between them. However, Estefanía is hesitant on pursuing the relationship further due to Luis Alberto's closeness to the regime. What she doesn't know is that he is the leader of the leader of the struggle against the dictatorship going by the alias "El Guácharo".

Estefanía becomes a victim of blackmail of Pedro who desires her to marry him for her father's release from prison. Luis Alberto is heartbroken thinking she is involved with Pedro. Being chased by the authorities, Luis Alberto escapes to Spain. Julio César, a journalist working at the Palacio de Miraflores meets her and they fall in love and marry. He has now become the new "El Guácharo". Pedro decides to kill Julio César to get Estefanía back. Finally the dictatorship falls and the whole country is happy, with the evil doers getting punished.

This story of love, persecution and intrigue in the underground struggle against a dictatorship. Set against a background of torture, jail and conspiracy which provide a sense of constant suspense and fast-paced action. "Estefanía" is the most famous actress in the world although her brother is richer. Eventually, as the government topples from power, all parties involved, the good and the bad, receive their just rewards.

Cast
Pierina España as Estefanía Gallardo
José Luis Rodríguez as Luis Alberto Seijas "El Guácharo"
Gustavo Rodríguez as Pedro Escobar
Carlos Olivier as Julio César Ordóñez
Tomás Henríquez as Manuel Fulvio Lanz
Grecia Colmenares as Ana Maria Escobar
Arturo Calderón as Jose Francisco Gallardo
Mahuampi Acosta as Mama Rosa
Agustina Martín as Petra SeijasqRafael Briceño as Jesus Maria Seijas
 as Rosalia
Henry Zakka as Gabo Seijas
Patricia Noguera as Chepina
Luis Rivas as Perez Jimenez
María Conchita Alonso as Silvana Cataldo
Alan Garcia Perez as "el mudito"
Nury Flores

See also
List of famous telenovelas

References

External links
Estefanía at the Internet Movie Database
Profile on "Archivo de Telenovelas"

1979 telenovelas
RCTV telenovelas
Venezuelan telenovelas
1979 Venezuelan television series debuts
1980 Venezuelan television series endings
Spanish-language telenovelas
Television shows set in Caracas